Francisca L. Castro (born , 1966) is a Filipino educator, trade union activist, and politician. She is a member of the Philippine House of Representatives under the Alliance of Concerned Teachers party-list. In Congress, she is among the principal authors of Republic Act 11466, which increased the minimum monthly salary of nurses in the Philippines. Castro is the former secretary general of ACT. In 2019, she was awarded the Arthur Svensson International Prize for Trade Union Rights for her work organizing teachers and the Febe Velasquez Trade Union Rights Award for her work in defense of trade unions and human rights.

Early life and education 
Castro’s father was a driver and her mother was a housewife. Castro and her four siblings all graduated from public schools.

Castro took BSE Math at the Philippine Normal University where she graduated cum laude. She had intended to become an accountant but her family could not afford to send her to a private school. In college, she was a member of the League of Filipino Students.

House of Representatives 

She was first elected in 2016.

She is co-author of the anti-endo bill that sought to give workers security of tenure by the ending the practice of labor contractualization.

She is among the Congress representatives that support the franchise renewal for broadcast company ABS-CBN.

In 2020, Castro joined fellow lawmakers in protesting the passage of House Bill number 6875, which eventually became the Anti-Terrorism Act of 2020.

In 2022, Castro was appointed as a deputy minority leader.

References 

Living people
Women members of the House of Representatives of the Philippines
21st-century Filipino women politicians
21st-century Filipino politicians
Party-list members of the House of Representatives of the Philippines
Filipino activists
Filipino educators
Filipino trade union leaders
Human rights activists
1966 births